Euxoa enixa is a moth of the family Noctuidae. It is found in the western Tien-Shan mountains, Fergana, Togus-Torau, Issyk-Kul, the Alexander Mountains and Aschabad.

External links
Lärchenwälder und kräuterreiche Wiesensteppen der lichten Taiga-Zone in der nördlichen Mongolei 

Euxoa
Moths described in 1906